Hasil is a village in Chakwal district, Punjab, Pakistan with a population of 15000.There are three public sector schools in this village. This village is located on the edge of river sawan. One notable person who was born in this village is Mr.Muhammad Ikram, a young lecturer in English at College of Arts and Sciences, University of Chakwal.

References

Populated places in Chakwal District